Lithuania competed at the Winter Olympic Games for the first time at the 1928 Winter Olympics in St. Moritz, Switzerland. Lithuania was represented by a single athlete, Kęstutis Bulota.

Speed skating

References

 Olympic Winter Games 1928, full results by sports-reference.com

Nations at the 1928 Winter Olympics
1928
Olympics, Winter